Cryptandromyces elegans is a species of fungi in the family Laboulbeniaceae. It is found in the Netherlands.

References

External links 
 Cryptandromyces elegans at Index Fungorum

Laboulbeniaceae
Fungi described in 2004